The  Jakob Glanzer Shul, or the former Chasidim Synagogue, is a synagogue at the Vuhil'na (Coal) Street Nr.3 in  Lviv, Ukraine.

History
The synagogue was built from 1841 to 1844 in a Baroque Revival style. Its construction was financed by Lvov merchant Jacob Glanzer, and in his honor named the "Jacob Glanzer Shul". In 1844 Jacob Glanzer's synagogue was the second-largest synagogue, after the Great city synagogue. The synagogue has been constructed in a complex with two stores. There was a prayer hall and two tiers of galleries for women were attached. And two tiers of balconies over the west side of the Shul  which was destroyed by the Soviets in the years 1959/60 (Noted by Rabbi B.Vernik)                                
It was also the location (only*) of a mikveh. Noted rabbi David Kahane, author of a memoir about the Holocaust, worked in the synagogue.  
During the Soviet period, ( after 1960 ) it was used as a gym.

On the end of year 1958 a few months before we left Lvov my parents donated our own  bath tub from our home on the Kalinina Street -(today Zamarstunivska Street) *helping to build a mikveh, at this time there wasn't a mikveh on the premises, - ( The mikveh  was on  Pidval’na  Street ) right afterwards the  Soviets closedown the Shul! ( Noted by Rabbi B. Vernik ).

After the Second World War in this Synagogue served as a Rabbi Yaakov Gur-Aryeh which was the main spiritual leader of the Jewish community in Lvov. 
After the death of Rabbi Yaakov Gur-Aryeh Soviets closed the synagogue took literally everything and removed all the Sifrei Torah. that was considered to be in the hundreds and were in the synagogue, not only in the Aron Kodesh but also in the cabinets below each window of the synagogue were these all Sifrei Torah were accommodate. ( Torah Scrolls ) from all destroyed synagogues of the city and they have moved them directly to Moscow and the premises handed over to an Institute. 
The main prayer hall was converted to a Sports Hall,  the western two tiers of galleries for women were dismantled,  the beautiful murals on the walls and ceiling were over painted, the Aron Kodesh  ( Torah Ark ) dismantled.
Wall cabinets and all the nice furniture of the synagogue was dismantled. (( Amended by Rabbi  B. Vernik who lived, grew up and studied in 58, then in 19 schools in Lviv after the war, until the day of the opening of the TV station on the High Castle Mount in the end of year 1958. ))  
The Synagogue was the main concourse despite of all this horror of Stalin's and after Stalin's dark days - a lot of people disappeared  send to Siberia and have been killed.

The Prayers in this Shul were very, very warm with a lot of hope for much better times !  
On the High Jewish holidays in the synagogue were thousands of people, but on Yom Kippur, it was just impossible to move, not only in the synagogue, as well as in the hallway and even a lot more of this, the Street of the Shul on afternoon so many people arrived and congregate, mainly students, who stood and talked quietly among themselves and waited for the Blow of the Shoifor,  listening to the sound of the Shoifor which symbolized the end of Yom Kippur. 
In the great Hall of the synagogue could be heard  "the thundering " wonderful voice of the 85 years old a famous **Cantor Boruch Leib Shulman. 
In the small Hall across the corridor were praying the Talmidej Chahomim and many Chasidim of different backgrounds and mostly were without a beard. 
On Saturdays there were three praying groups (Minion), one early morning at five o'clock in the morning, because they have to go to work early, a second group at seven o'clock in the morning, and the third group the talmidej chachomim and a lot of the Hasidim on nine o'clock Minion.
On the weekdays there were every day Minyanim. 
On the Shul back yard were working two Shochatim for chicken. 
On the Succoth holiday there were a Suka - this  all was happened in a horrible Stalin's and after Stalin's days between the years of 1946 -1958 – ( this is my testimony and a witness  from my very young age. )

Chazan Boruch Leib Shulman was a Professional Cantor (1870-1963 in 1946, lived in Lviv, and was the Cantor of this synagogue until its closure in 1961 Boruh Leib Shulman (1870, Township of Kalinkovichi, Minsk guberniya, 1963), Cantor, singer (tenor).
By Rabbi B. Vernik.

Since 1989 it has been used as a center of Jewish culture, the "Sholom Aleichem Jewish Culture Society". External walls of a building were repaired in 1990. (The window immured on the left side is the external indicator of the location of the Holy Ark.)

External links

 Alexander Denisenko's photographs of Lviv

Baroque Revival synagogues
Former synagogues in Ukraine
Hasidic Judaism in Ukraine
Hasidic synagogues
Orthodox synagogues in Ukraine
Synagogues completed in 1844
Synagogues in Lviv